The Ivy League women's basketball tournament is the conference tournament in basketball for the Ivy League, and is held alongside the Ivy League men's tournament at the same venue. The overall event is currently marketed as Ivy Madness. As with the men's tournament, the women's event is a single-elimination tournament involving the top four schools in the standings. The tournament format consists of two semifinal games on the first day (Saturday), with the No. 1 seed playing the No. 4 seed and the No. 2 seed playing the No. 3 seed, followed by the championship game played the next day (Sunday). The tournament winner receives the League's automatic bids to the NCAA Division I women's basketball tournament. The teams that finish with the best records from the 14-game, regular-season conference schedule will continue to be recognized as Ivy League champions.

Unlike the men's Ivy tournament, in which the regular-season champion receives an automatic berth in the National Invitation Tournament should it fail to win the conference tournament, a women's regular-season champion is technically not guaranteed a postseason berth if it does not make the NCAA tournament. However, the Women's National Invitation Tournament has a standing policy of inviting the top available team from each NCAA Division I conference once the NCAA women's tournament field has been set. (This difference is because unlike the men's NIT, the WNIT is neither owned nor operated by the NCAA.)

Prior to the formal tournament, the Ivy League used a one-game playoff if necessary to break ties eight times with two teams, and in 2001-02, a three-team tournament, in order to settle the conference championship.

The first two tournaments in 2017 and 2018 were held at the Palestra on the campus of the University of Pennsylvania. The 2019 event was held at John J. Lee Amphitheater, a venue located within Yale University's Payne Whitney Gymnasium. In 2019, the Ivy League announced that the men's and women's tournaments would rotate among the remaining conference members through 2025. Due to COVID-19 disruptions, the 2020 tournament was canceled, and the Ivy League did not play a 2020–21 season. The tournament resumed in 2022, with all venues shifted forward by two years.

Champions

Tournament championships by school

Tournament appearances by school

List of regular season champions
Since 1974, the Ivy League has had regular season titles for women's basketball.
 1974–75: Princeton
 1975–76: Princeton
 1976–77: Princeton
 1977–78: Princeton
 1978–79: Yale
 1979–80: Dartmouth
 1980–81: Dartmouth
 1981–82: Dartmouth
 1982–83: Dartmouth
 1983–84: Brown
 1984–85: Brown & Princeton
 1985–86: Dartmouth & Harvard
 1986–87: Dartmouth
 1987–88: Dartmouth & Harvard
 1988–89: Dartmouth
 1989–90: Dartmouth
 1990–91: Harvard
 1991–92: Brown
 1992–93: Brown
 1993–94: Brown & Dartmouth
 1994–95: Dartmouth
 1995–96: Harvard
 1996–97: Harvard
 1997–98: Harvard
 1998–99: Dartmouth & Princeton
 1999–00: Dartmouth
 2000–01: Penn
 2001–02: Harvard
 2002–03: Harvard
 2003–04: Penn
 2004–05: Dartmouth &Harvard
 2005–06: Brown, Dartmouth & Princeton
 2006–07: Harvard
 2007–08: Cornell, Dartmouth & Harvard
 2008–09: Dartmouth
 2009–10: Princeton
 2010–11: Princeton
 2011–12: Princeton
 2012–13: Princeton
 2013–14: Penn
 2014–15: Princeton
 2015–16: Penn
 2016–17: Penn
 2017–18: Princeton
 2018–19: Penn & Princeton
 2019–20: Princeton
 2021–22: Princeton
 2022–23: Columbia & Princeton

References

 

 
Women's basketball competitions in the United States
Recurring sporting events established in 2016
2016 establishments in Pennsylvania